The Corolla E100 was the seventh generation of cars sold by Toyota under the Corolla nameplate. This generation of Corolla was larger, heavier, and visually more aerodynamic than the model it replaced. With its  wheelbase, the Corolla had moved into the compact size class once occupied by the Corona and Camry. The Corolla again had an equivalent model Sprinter, with the Sprinter Trueno being equivalent to the Corolla Levin and both exclusive to Toyota Vista Store Japanese dealerships.

Design
The development of the seventh-generation Corolla was led by chief engineer Akihiko Saito. Not only was the wheelbase increased, but the new Corolla also received a wider track than did the 90-series. The chunky, solid design reflected the desire of development chief Dr. Akihiko Saito to make a 'mini-Lexus', to build on the recent successes of Toyota's new flagship range. The 100-series models used fewer body panels than their predecessors, for increased strength, lower cost, and fewer panel gaps (providing a cleaner appearance and lower wind resistance). The headlights were now from polycarbonate rather than glass, and almost 90 percent of the bodyshell was made from galvanized steel - compared to about 60 percent in the preceding generation.

Japan

The standard Corolla model range included the three-door hatchback Corolla FX, four-door sedan and five-door station wagon (and light van) models. Also returning in this generation was the two-door coupé Corolla Levin. A 4WD variant of the sedan and station wagon was also available with a 1.6 liter petrol or 2.0 liter diesel engine.

The four -door "pillared hardtop" Corolla Ceres and Sprinter Marino were introduced in 1992. They bore no real exterior resemblance but feature the chassis and most of the engine range of the standard Corollas, and used the Levin/Trueno dashboard. Minor facelift changes were introduced in May 1993. These included a new grille, a reconfiguration of the rear lamps and various other bits of trim and garnish.

The E100 sedan and hatchbacks introduced in 1991 lasted until the introduction of the E110 in May 1995, while the E100 wagons and the related van continued in the Japanese market alongside the newer Corolla and Sprinter Carib models. Passenger wagons were available in 'G-Touring', 'L-Touring' and high-performance 'BZ-Touring' guises, while "Van" and "Business Wagon" models were basically stripped out wagons with leaf-sprung solid axle rear suspensions. Business Wagons typically had slightly higher equipment levels than simpler vans. Toyota also offered a High-Roof version of the Corolla (and Sprinter) Van. The Corolla Touring Wagon continued until 2000, while both commercial versions continued to serve the Japanese market until July 2002, long outliving the mainstream E110 models in Japan. It was succeeded by the Probox.

TRD2000 
In October 1994, Toyota Racing Development launched a special edition of the Corolla for the Japanese market, known as the TRD2000. These cars were based on the GT sedan and converted to replicate the 1994 Corolla JTCC race car specifications. Initially, 99 cars were planned to be built, but only 10 cars were sold because of the high price, even more than the Celica GT-Four ST205.

Gallery 

Japanese market manual transaxles:
C140 4M/T
C50 5M/T
C51 5M/T
C52 5M/T
C56 5M/T
C160 6M/T
S50 5M/T
E59F 5M/T
E55F 5M/T (4WD)

Japanese market automatic transaxles:
A240L 4A/T
A245E 4A/T
A246E 4A/T
A241L 4A/T
A132L 3A/T
A241H 4A/T (4WD)

Japanese market chassis:
The following list is not complete or inclusive:
EE101 — 1.3L 4E-FE sedan, hatchback (DX, LX, XE)
EE102V — 1.3L 4E-FE van
EE103V — 1.5L 5E-FE van
EE104G — 1.5L 5E-FE business wagon
EE106V — 1.3L 2E van
EE107V — 1.5L 3E van
EE108G — 1.5L 3E business wagon
AE100, G — 1.5L 5A-FE sedan (DX, LX, XE, SE-Limited), coupé (Levin S), and Wagon (L-Touring, G-Touring)
AE101, G — 1.6L sedan (SE-G, GT), FX hatchback (SJ, GT), Wagon (BZ-Touring), hardtop Ceres, and coupé (Levin SJ, GT, GT APEX, GT-Z)
AE104, G — 1.6L sedan 4WD (LX Limited, XE, SE Limited) and Touring Wagon 4WD
AE109V — 1.6L van 4WD
CE100, G — 2.0L diesel sedan and Touring Wagon
CE101G — 2.2L diesel Touring Wagon
CE102G — 2.2L diesel business wagon
CE104 — 2.0L diesel sedan 4WD
CE105V — 2.2L diesel van 4WD
CE106V — 2.0L diesel van
CE107V — 2.2L diesel van
CE108G — 2.0L diesel business wagon
CE109V — 2.0L diesel van 4WD

Asia

In the Philippines, the E100 Corolla is nicknamed "Big Body". Three variants of the E100 Corolla were sold there; XL, XE, and GLi. The XL and XE both offered the 1.3-liter, carbureted 2E engine, with the latter enjoying extra features like power steering, alloy wheels, digital clock and tachometer. The GLi received a 1.6 liter fuel-injected motor (4A-FE). The top model was offered in both 5-speed manual and automatic transmissions, while the XL and XE both only came with the manual. This generation of the Corolla was the first 1.6 liter car to introduce  alloy wheels to the country in 1992. Other pioneer features that followed were rear seatbelts, front cup holders (late 1994) and a driver's airbag (late 1995). ABS followed during its later years.

The E100 Corolla sedan is nicknamed as the "Great Corolla" in Indonesia and nicknamed "Corolla SEG 100" in Malaysia. Initially the trim levels were 1.3 SE and 1.6 SE-G. The smaller engined model was replaced by a 1.6 SE in 1994.

The 1.3 XLi, 1.5 GLi sedan, wagon, and Levin 1.5 SJ coupé were sold in Hong Kong.

North America

In North America, the Corolla was new for the 1993 model year. It had different headlights (independent high/low beams), grille, bumpers (extended) and trunk garnish for the Base and DX Sedans. The base model came with the 1.6 liter 4A-FE 2nd-generation engine with straighter intake-tracts in the head. The DX, LE and wagon came with the 1.8 liter 7A-FE. Every model has fully independent suspension, front disk brakes and rear drum brakes. The LE (Luxury Edition) has sporty front seats and was available in the US with A/T only or available in Canada with either A/T or M/T. Sporty Corollas and 4WD Corollas were no longer offered or imported in this generation, with the Corolla Sport being replaced by the smaller Paseo. Some 1993 Corolla sedans sold were also produced in Japan, due to factory delays. All of the wagons were produced at the Takaoka plant in Japan.

Minor changes occurred for the 1996 model year. Among these changes, the DX received bright red/clear tail lights and rear garnish, and new wheel covers. The Base model (and later the CE) came with restyled gray plastic trunk garnish.

In 1997, the DX wagon was dropped, but a special CE (Classic Edition) sedan was offered and it incorporated a number of popular features in one value-priced package. Among the standard equipment were the options for power windows and locks, A/C, power steering, a four-speaker stereo, manual remote mirrors and special floor mats and exterior badging. All models received additional side-impact protection to meet new federal standards. And for the first time, during 1997, all the Corollas sold in the United States were built in North America at the NUMMI plant in Fremont, California and the TMMC plant in Canada. By the end of the 1997 model year, the Corolla had become the best-selling nameplate in automotive history, overtaking the VW Beetle. Official Toyota accessories available as either factory upgrades or dealer-/port-installed options include: power sunroof (DX only), aluminum alloy wheels (DX only), front end mask, rear spoiler, mudguards, V.I.P. keyless entry system (CE "Classic Edition" and DX Sedan only. Requires Power Package.), V.I.P RS3000 remote keyless security system, V.I.P. S1000 passive alarm system, floor mats, wood dash accents, and a Gold emblem package (DX only).

North American market chassis codes:
 AE101 — Sedan 4-door with 1.6 4A-FE (Standard, CE)
 AE102 — Sedan 4-door and Wagon 5-door with 1.8 7A-FE (DX, LE)

Europe

The five-door Sprinter was sold as the Corolla Sprinter in some markets in Europe, and simply the Corolla liftback in others. The three and five-door Corolla hatchback was also sold in Europe, where it took the lion's share of Corolla sales. It was available mostly in normal (non-sports) specs unlike the three-door-only FX range available in Japan, although some mildly hot models were also marketed.

In Europe, the hatchback sold better than the sedan and estate. The typical trim levels are Base, XLi and GLi. A few select, rare models featured the 1.8L 7A-FE engine, including the 1.8 GXi 3-door hatchback in the UK, and the 1.8 XLi 4WD estate in certain markets. The sedan has its rear license plate mounted on the trunklid as opposed to the bumper on other region models. In Germany and some other markets, the 1331 cc 4E engine was referred to as a 1.4 since it displaced over 1300 cc.

British sales began a bit later than elsewhere in the world, in August 1992. Originally only the 1.3 and 1.6 petrol engines were on offer, the 2.0 Diesel and the faintly sporting 1.8 GXi were added in March 1992. The GXi has a claimed , an incremental boost over the 1.8 4WD. In August 1995 the lineup was revised; the new models in the UK market were Sportif, GS, CD, Si, and CDX. The GS featured a fully color-coded exterior and with full electrics and a tilt/slide steel sunroof, as well as an upgraded interior with white dials and a rev counter.

In Germany, Europe's largest national automobile market, the E100 sustained the Corolla's reputation for reliability and economy. In 1995, it topped the small family car class in a reliability survey of 4-6 year old cars undertaken by the German Automobile Association (ADAC), with 5.3 recorded breakdowns per 1000 cars for four-year-old cars and 10.1 for six-year-old cars: this compared with 12.0 breakdowns per 1,000 cars for four-year-old Volkswagen Golfs and 21.8 for six-year-old Golfs.  (The class loser was the Fiat Tipo with 38.3 breakdowns per 1,000 for four-year-old cars and 44.0 for six-year-old Tipos.)

European market chassis:
EE100 — 1.3L 2E
EE101 — 1.3L 4E-FE
AE101 — 1.6L 4A-FE
AE102 — 1.8L 7A-FE
AE103 — 1.8L 7A-FE 4WD
CE100 — 2.0L 2C diesel.

Australia/New Zealand 

In late 1992, New Zealand-assembled E100 Corollas were introduced to the New Zealand market. These vehicles were assembled at Toyota's Thames factory. Trim levels consisted of 1.3L XL, 1.6L GL, 1.6L GS, and 1.6L GLX. Available bodystyles were sedan, five-door hatchback, five-door liftback, and five-door wagon. There was also a van version of the 1.3-liter hatchback; this model was a strict two-seater. The 1.3 is carburetted while the 1.6 is fuel injected, providing . The 1.6's lack of low-end power was mentioned by period road testers and later the torquier 1.8-liter engine was also made available. The entire Corolla range now received power steering as standard equipment. As with most other New Zealand-assembled Toyotas of the eighties and nineties, ex-racer Chris Amon had been allowed to adjust the suspension settings of the E100 Corolla.

During 1994, the E100 Corolla became the first Toyota model to be built at the new Altona plant (production of the Corolla from 1968-1993 was at the Port Melbourne facility). This model came in hatchback (Seca) and sedan variants. The trim levels consisted of 1.6L CSi (base model), 1.6L and 1.8L CSX, 1.8L Conquest, sporty 1.8L RV (hatchback only) and the top of the range 1.8L Ultima (sedan only). Special edition models were included in the model lineup, and between 1994 and 1996 Toyota also imported the five-door liftback Sprinter model. In 1999, production of the E100 Corolla in Australia was terminated and Toyota Australia returned to Japanese imports, this time model AE112R.

In May 2017, ANCAP performed a head-on crash test between a 1998 E100 Seca and a 2017 E180 Auris/Corolla. The E100 scored 0.40 out of a possible 16 points, highlighting the safety improvement of newer cars.

References

Cars introduced in 1991

2000s cars
Cars of Australia
Motor vehicles manufactured in the United States
100
Hatchbacks